Tyler Gabarra (born July 28, 1997) is an American soccer player who currently plays for Albion San Diego in the National Independent Soccer Association.

Career

College & Amateur
Gabarra played four years of college soccer at North Carolina State University between 2016 and 2019, making 60 appearances, scoring 3 goals and tallying 8 assists.

While playing at college, Gabarra appeared in the USL PDL with Baltimore Bohemians in 2016, NPSL side FC Baltimore in 2018.

Professional
On June 30, 2020, Gabarra signed with USL Championship side Loudoun United. He made his debut for Loudoun on July 19, 2020, appearing as a 62nd-minute substitute during a 3-1 loss to Hartford Athletic.

Following the 2021 USL Championship season, Gabarra's contract with Loudoun was not renewed. He then joined Albion San Diego in the National Independent Soccer Association.

Personal life
Gabarra is the son of former American soccer player and coach Jim Gabarra and former women's soccer player Carin Jennings-Gabarra.

References

External links
Tyler Gabarra - 2019 - Men's Soccer at NC State Wolfpack men's soccer
 at USL Championship

1997 births
Living people
American soccer players
Association football midfielders
NC State Wolfpack men's soccer players
Bay Cities FC players
Baltimore Bohemians players
Loudoun United FC players
Soccer players from Maryland
USL League Two players
National Independent Soccer Association players
National Premier Soccer League players
USL Championship players